Jorge Terán Juárez (born 18 February 1959) is a Mexican politician affiliated with the PRI. As of 2013 he served as Deputy of the LXII Legislature of the Mexican Congress representing San Luis Potosí.

References

1959 births
Living people
People from San Luis Potosí
Institutional Revolutionary Party politicians
21st-century Mexican politicians
Deputies of the LXII Legislature of Mexico
Members of the Chamber of Deputies (Mexico) for San Luis Potosí